Münchsmünster is a municipality in the district of Pfaffenhofen in Bavaria in Germany.
The town grew up around the former Münchsmünster Abbey, which was demolished around 1817 and its stones used for construction of houses.

Gallery

References

Pfaffenhofen (district)